Dorothy Eagle, nee Glasgow (born 1912) was an English  editor at the Clarendon Press, who compiled several literary reference works.

Life
Dorothy Eagle was born on 10 March 1912 in Newcastle upon Tyne. From 1953 until 1978, she was a member of the editorial staff at the Clarendon Press.

Her son John (died 2018) was an artist and photographer, who published photo-essays on Irish lighthouses.

Works
 The Oxford Companion to English Literature
 The Oxford Literary Guide to the British Isles, 
 The Concise Oxford Dictionary of English Literature, Oxford University Press, 1977.
 The Oxford Illustrated Dictionary

References

1912 births
Year of death missing
English book editors
Oxford University Press people